Frank Cumming Hibben (December 5, 1910 – June 11, 2002) was a well-known archaeologist whose research focused on the U.S. Southwest. As a professor at the University of New Mexico (UNM) and writer of popular books and articles, he inspired many people to study archaeology. He was also controversial, being suspected of scientific fraud during his studies of Paleo-Indian cultures.

Early life
Hibben was born on December 5, 1910 in Lakewood, Ohio. He became interested in archaeology as a child, working summers at digs.  He received his bachelor's degree in archaeology from Princeton University in 1933 and  a master's degree in zoology from the UNM in 1936.

Career
While a graduate student, Hibben was put in charge of the university's archaeology collections (the core of what became the Maxwell Museum of Anthropology). He returned East for one year to attend Harvard University, which awarded him a Ph.D. in anthropology in 1940. Hibben then taught at UNM until his retirement, except for a period of service in the U.S. Navy during World War II.

During much of his career, Hibben was the director of the Maxwell Museum of Anthropology.

Hibben's first marriage and subsequent investments made him a millionaire. In 2000, he donated part of his fortune to build an archaeology research building at UNM. (Due to the controversies surrounding his career, the decision to name the new building after him was questioned.) When Hibben died, the remainder of his fortune was used, as he had directed, to endow scholarships at UNM.

The primary source of the controversies was Hibben's claim to have found a deposit with pre-Clovis artifacts (including projectile points, which he termed "Sandia points") in Sandia Cave (in the Sandia Mountains near Albuquerque, New Mexico). Hibben believed the layers to be about 25,000 years old, much older than the Paleo-Indian cultures previously documented in the U.S. Southwest. The layers also included the bones of Pleistocene species such as camels, mastodons, and horses.

The 25,000 year age for the "Sandia Man" deposits was a best guess based on the strata in the cave, and was later called into question, in part through radiocarbon dating. Also, research notes by Wesley Bliss (who had excavated in the cave in 1936) and others indicate that animal burrowing led to a mixing of deposits. The notion of a "Sandia Man" occupation of the U.S. Southwest is no longer accepted by professional archaeologists, but that in itself is not the source of controversy. Instead, some researchers believe that artifacts were "salted" (fraudulently placed) in the cave deposits to support the notion of the "Sandia Man" occupation. Those who believe that fraud was committed often suspect Hibben of being involved in the fraud. The evidence is inconclusive, however, and Hibben maintained his innocence in the matter until his death.

In 1943, Hibben described a visit to Chinitna Bay on the west side of Cook Inlet in Alaska, where he reported finding Yuma-like projectile points like those found at the Clovis Site in New Mexico and a projectile point similar to those produced by the Folsom culture, who lived on the High Plains and adjacent regions 10,000 years ago. In addition to the projectile points, he reported finding mammoth bones. A later investigation of the geology and geoarchaeology of Chinitna Bay using personal notes, photographs, and directions personally supply by Hibben successfully relocated the locations and strata from which the mammoth bones, Yuma-like projectile points, and projectile point "possibly affiliated with, Folsom" were reported. They found that the strata in which Hibben reported finding Folsom- and Yuma-like projectile points and mammoths bones all accumulated during the Late Holocene in "a muddy, intertidal environment". As result, they concluded that the projectile points are not associated with any Paleo-Indian cultures and the identification of the bones as being those of a mammoth is questionable.

Hibben's research on later cultures was far less controversial. While a graduate student he excavated and reported on Riana Ruin in the Rio Chama drainage. His Harvard dissertation was based on extensive field studies of the Gallina Culture of northern New Mexico. In 1954 he began a long term research project on Pottery Mound, a site best known for its many kiva murals. Hibben also excavated at Comanche Springs south of Albuquerque, locating Spanish Colonial period and other remains.

In addition to being an archaeologist, Hibben was a big-game hunter, and was awarded the Weatherby Hunting and Conservation Award in 1964. He also served in various capacities related to wild animals, such as chairman of the Albuquerque Zoological Board (1960–1970) and chairman of the New Mexico State Game and Fish Commission (1961–1971). Hibben's big game experience carried over into a series of popular books and articles on hunting.

See also
 Los Lunas Decalogue Stone

Selected publications
"Association of Man with Pleistocene Mammals in the Sandia Mountains, New Mexico," American Antiquity, 2(4):260-263. [the first article to describe Sandia Cave).
 The Lost Americans (1946)
 Hunting American Lions (1948)
 Hunting American Bears (1950)
 Treasure in the Dust (1951)
 Prehistoric Man in Europe (1958)
 Digging Up America (1960)
 Hunting in Africa (1962)
 Kiva Art of the Anasazi (1975)
 Under the African Sun (1999)

References

1910 births
2002 deaths
Harvard University alumni
University of New Mexico alumni
University of New Mexico faculty
Princeton University alumni
20th-century American archaeologists